The 1937 NC State Wolfpack football team was an American football team that represented North Carolina State University as a member of the Southern Conference (SoCon) during the 1937 college football season. In its first season under head coach Williams Newton, the team compiled a 5–3–1 record (4–2–1 against SoCon opponents) and was outscored by a total of 92 to 91.

Schedule

References

NC State
NC State Wolfpack football seasons
NC State Wolfpack football